Émile Jean Ghislain Hanse (10 August 1892 – 5 April 1981) was a Belgian football (soccer) player who competed in the 1920 Summer Olympics. He was a member of the Belgium team, which won the gold medal in the football tournament. Hanse played for R.U. Saint-Gilloise and appeared in 254 matches and scored 23 goals.

References

External links
 
 
 
 

1892 births
1981 deaths
Belgian footballers
Footballers at the 1920 Summer Olympics
Footballers at the 1924 Summer Olympics
Olympic footballers of Belgium
Olympic gold medalists for Belgium
Belgium international footballers
Olympic medalists in football
Medalists at the 1920 Summer Olympics
Association football midfielders
20th-century Belgian people